Svetozar (Cyrillic script: Светозар) is a Slavic origin given name and may refer to:

Svetozar Boroević (1856–1920), Austro-Hungarian Field Marshal
Svetozar Čiplić (born 1965), Serbian politician
Svetozar Đanić (1917–1941), Serbian footballer
Svetozar Delić (1885–1967), the first communist mayor of Zagreb, Croatia
Svetozar Gligorić (born 1923), Serbian chess grandmaster
Svetozar Ivačković (1844–1924),  post-Romantic Serbian architect
Svetozar Koljević (born 1930), author, historian and translator
Svetozar Marković (1846–1875), Serbian political activist
Svetozar Marović (born 1955), lawyer and a Montenegrin politician
Svetozar Mijin (born 1978), Serbian footballer
Svetozar Miletić (1826–1901), advocate, politician, mayor of Novi Sad, and political leader of Serbs in Vojvodina
Svetozar Pribićević (born 1875), Serbian politician from Croatia who worked hard for creation of unitaristic Yugoslavia
Svetozar Ristovski (born 1972), Macedonian film director
Svetozar Vujković (1899–1949), Serbian police officer and head of the Banjica Concentration Camp in German-occupied Serbia
Svetozar Vujović (1940–1993), Bosnian-Serb football player
Svetozar Vukmanović-Tempo (1912–2000), Montenegrin communist and member of the Central Committee of the League of Communists of Yugoslavia

See also
Slavic names

Slavic masculine given names
Serbian masculine given names
Bulgarian masculine given names
Masculine given names